True Light Girls' College (TLGC) is a Christian girls' secondary school in Kowloon, Hong Kong. It was founded in 1973, to commemorate the centenary of the first True Light Middle School, which was founded in 1872 in Canton by the American missionary, Harriet Newell Noyes. It is run by the Kowloon True Light Middle School Management Board with the assistance of the Hong Kong Council of the Church of Christ in China.

The school is an aided EMI secondary school. Since it was built according to the standards of 30 years ago, much effort has been made to improve the basic facilities of the school premises to meet the needs of the a changing society. A new annex was completed in Autumn 2005, providing four more classrooms and some special rooms in addition to the 20 classroom in the main building. There are a total of 24 classrooms, 16 special rooms, a hall, a covered playground, a canteen, a library, a student activity room, a gymnastics room, a badminton court and two basketball courts. Student TV and a School History Gallery were established in 2013 to celebrate the school's 40th Anniversary. Later on, an E-learning Centre was built in 2014 to facilitate students' learning with the convenient use of gadgets and easy access to the Wi-Fi network.

School Motto
Thou art the light of the world（Matthew 5:14）

Teaching Staff
There are in total 48 teaching staff in approved establishment with 6 staff who are not included in approved establishment. 100% teaching staffs have Teacher Certificate / Diploma in Education. 48% teaching staffs have Bachelor Degree while 50% have Master / Doctorate Degree or above. 33% teaching staffs have Special Education Training.

School uniform
The school uses a cheongsam as the student uniform, and was the first Hong Kong secondary school to adopt the garment as such.

Class Structure
There are 24 classes under the New Senior Secondary (NSS)  curriculum: 4 classes at each level from S1 to S6.

Notable alumnae
 G.E.M., Hong Kong pop singer (graduated 2008)

See also
Kowloon True Light School
True Light Middle School of Hong Kong
Hong Kong True Light College
Education in Hong Kong
List of secondary schools in Hong Kong

References

External links
 Official website

Girls' schools in Hong Kong
Hong Kong Council of the Church of Christ in China
Protestant secondary schools in Hong Kong
King's Park, Hong Kong